The Cathedral Church of Saint John the Evangelist is the cathedral of the Anglican Diocese of Hong Kong Island, and mother church to the Province of Hong Kong and Macao. It is the seat of the Archbishop of Hong Kong and the Bishop of Hong Kong Island.

At Garden Road, Central, the cathedral is located in a prime central position, surrounded by the Bank of China Tower, Cheung Kong Center, HSBC Building, Court of Final Appeal Building, Former Central Government Offices, and the Former French Mission Building.

St John's Cathedral is one of the five cathedrals in Hong Kong. The others are Holy Trinity Cathedral (Anglican), All Saints' Cathedral (Anglican), St Luke Orthodox Cathedral (Eastern Orthodox), and the Cathedral of the Immaculate Conception (Roman Catholic).

History

The congregation that would become the cathedral held its first Sunday service on Sunday, 11 March 1849, as "Hongkong Colonial Chapel", the founding church of the Diocese of Victoria.  It was consecrated as St John's Cathedral by The Rt Revd George Smith, Bishop of Victoria in 1852.

On the morning of 8 December 1941, the day after their attack on Pearl Harbor, the Japanese attacked Hong Kong. On Christmas morning 1941 the Reverend Alaric P. Rose took the morning service in St John's with a congregation of one hundred, while shelling continued on the island.

During the Japanese Occupation of Hong Kong, the cathedral was converted into a club for the Japanese. Many of the original fittings were stripped out, including the original stained glass windows, which had been created by William Morris' firm.

On 9 September 1945, the first service after the arrival of the Royal Navy was held in the cathedral.

In 1981, Peter Kwong became the first Chinese Bishop of Hong Kong.

The site of St John's Cathedral is the only freehold land in Hong Kong, granted in fee simple pursuant to s.6(1) of the Church of England Trust Ordinance (Cap.1014) of 1930. All other land tenure in Hong Kong is leasehold in nature.

On 5 June 2012, there was a service of thanksgiving at the Cathedral in honour of the Diamond Jubilee of Elizabeth II.

Architecture
It is the oldest surviving Western ecclesiastical building in Hong Kong, and the oldest Anglican church in the Far East.

The cathedral's architectural style is a plain, unadorned adaptation of 13th century English and Decorated Gothic, which was the popular revivalist style for churches at the time. Along the north wall is a memorial tablet to Captain William Thornton Bate RN, who was killed in the battle on Canton in 1857. A similar tablet is found at St Ann's Church in Portsea, Portsmouth, Hampshire.

The bell tower of the cathedral is decorated with a large "VR" on the west face, in commemoration of the institution's founding during the reign of Queen Victoria. The north and south faces of the tower are decorated with the coats-of-arms of two former governors of Hong Kong, Sir John Davis and Sir George Bonham.

The first pew on the south side of the interior bears the Royal Arms, as it was formerly reserved for the governor or any member of the Royal Family visiting Hong Kong before the Handover in 1997.

It was declared a monument of Hong Kong in 1996.

War Memorial
Next to the cathedral is a large Memorial Cross, unveiled by Governor Sir Reginald Stubbs in 1921 in memory of the soldiers killed in the First World War. During the Japanese occupation the cross was reduced to a straight granite column. In 1952 it was replaced by a Celtic cross, with an inscription added to commemorate those who had died in both World Wars. The original bronze tablet with the names of the First World War dead is held inside the cathedral, in St Michael's Chapel.

Every year ex-British Army members hold a memorial service at the Memorial Cross.

Beside the Memorial Cross is a tombstone covering the remains of Private Ronald Douglas Maxwell, who was killed in Wan Chai three days before the ceasefire. This is the only grave within the cathedral precinct, and is registered by the Commonwealth War Graves Commission.

Clergy

Gallery

See also
 Hong Kong Sheng Kung Hui
 List of Anglican churches in Hong Kong
 List of cathedrals
 Places of worship in Hong Kong
 St. John's Cathedral, Taipei

References

External links

 St John's Cathedral Official Site
 Hong Kong Sheng Kung Hui
 CWGC: St John's Cathedral Grounds

Anglican cathedrals in Asia
Anglican church buildings in Hong Kong
Anglican Diocese of Hong Kong Island
Cathedrals in Hong Kong
Central, Hong Kong
Commonwealth War Graves Commission cemeteries in Hong Kong
Deans of Hong Kong
Declared monuments of Hong Kong
Government Hill
Hong Kong Sheng Kung Hui
Churches completed in 1849
1847 establishments in Hong Kong